The 2002 FIFA World Cup OFC–CONMEBOL qualification play-off was a two-legged home-and-away tie between the winners of the Oceania qualifying tournament, Australia, and the fifth-placed team from the South American qualifying tournament, Uruguay. The games were played on 20 November and 25 November 2001 in Melbourne and Montevideo respectively. Australia was hoping to play in the FIFA World Cup for the first time since 1974 and Uruguay since 1990.

In the first leg, Australia beat Uruguay 1–0 in Melbourne while Uruguay took revenge in the second leg, easily defeating Australia 3–0 in Montevideo. Uruguay won the series 3–1 on aggregate, therefore qualifying for the World Cup held in Korea and Japan.

Australian players were spat on, punched and abused by a mob of Uruguayan fans on arrival at Montevideo's international airport for the second leg.

Venues

Background

Match details

First leg

Second leg

Aftermath 
Uruguay qualified for the 2002 FIFA World Cup Finals in South Korea and Japan, and were drawn into Group A with defending champions France, Denmark and debutants Senegal.  After losing 2–1 to Denmark in their opening match, Uruguay drew France 0–0 and in the final match they also drew 3–3 to Senegal despite being 3–0 down, finishing third in the group on two points.

Australia played in the 2002 OFC Nations Cup qualified automatically. The Socceroos were drawn into a group with Vanuatu, Fiji and New Caledonia and won 2–0, 11–0 and 8–0 respectively, and topped the group, proceeding to the semi-final stage. Against Tahiti, a goal from Damian Mori in extra time secured a 2–1 win and a place in the final against New Zealand. Australia lost 1–0, leaving the side as runners-up and New Zealand qualifying for the 2003 FIFA Confederations Cup.

Australia and Uruguay met again in the 2005 CONMEBOL-OFC play-off, with heightened security measures following the 2001 airport incident in Montevideo.

References 

FIFA
Play-off CONMEBOL-OFC
FIFA World Cup qualification inter-confederation play-offs
Australia national soccer team matches
Uruguay national football team matches
World
qual
November 2001 sports events in Australia
November 2001 sports events in South America
Sports competitions in Melbourne
Sports competitions in Montevideo
2000s in Melbourne
2000s in Montevideo
International association football competitions hosted by Australia
International association football competitions hosted by Uruguay